Magnolia henryi is a species of plant in the family Magnoliaceae. It is found in China, Laos, Myanmar, and Thailand. It is threatened by habitat loss.

References

henryi
Data deficient plants
Taxonomy articles created by Polbot